Cnemaspis bayuensis, also known as Kampung Bayu rock gecko, Gua Bayu rock gecko, or Bayu Cave rock gecko, is a species of gecko endemic to western Malaysia.

References

Cnemaspis
Reptiles described in 2008